William Bradley-King (born December 22, 1997) is an American football defensive end for the Washington Commanders of the National Football League (NFL). He played college football at Arkansas State and Baylor and was drafted by Washington in the seventh round of the 2021 NFL Draft.

Professional career
Bradley-King was drafted by the Washington Football Team in the seventh round (240th overall) of the 2021 NFL Draft. He signed his four-year rookie contract on May 13, 2021. Bradley-King was released on August 31, 2021, but re-signed to the practice squad the following day. 

On December 13, 2021, he was placed on the COVID-19 reserve list and was activated on December 22. Bradley-King signed to the active roster on January 8, 2022.

On August 30, 2022, Bradley-King was waived by the Commanders and signed to the practice squad the next day. He signed a reserve/future contract on January 9, 2023.

References

External links

Washington Commanders bio
Baylor Bears bio
Arkansas State Red Wolves bio

Living people
1997 births
American football defensive ends
Arkansas State Red Wolves football players
Baylor Bears football players
Players of American football from Kansas City, Missouri
Washington Commanders players
Washington Football Team players